Gamla Ullevi may refer to:

Gamla Ullevi (1916), a Swedish football stadium built in 1916, demolished in 2007
Gamla Ullevi, a Swedish football stadium built in 2009 at the site of the 1916 stadium
"Gamla Ullevi" / "Skisser för sommaren", a double A-side single by Kent